Käte Alving (1896–1974) was a German stage and film actress.

Selected filmography
 The Call of the Sea (1951)
 Consul Strotthoff (1954)
 Freddy, the Guitar and the Sea (1959)
 The Ambassador (1960)
 The True Jacob (1960)

References

Bibliography
 Gerd Heinrichs. Schauspieler und Krebs: sind Schauspieler Krebspatienten oder Krebspatienten Schauspieler?. Wagner Verlag sucht Autoren, 2009.

External links

1896 births
1974 deaths
German film actresses
German stage actresses
Actresses from Hamburg